Taïna Adama Soro (born 20 December 1981) is an Ivorian former footballer whose preferred position was a midfielder.

Career
Soro began his career in Racing Club d'Abobo before joining Académie de Sol Beni in 2001. He played for one year in the youth team from ASEC Mimosas before being transferred to Sabé Sports de Bouna. At Bouna he played 24 games and scored 7 goals, after which he was called back to ASEC, where he played in CAF Champions League in 2004. In January 2006 he joined Belarusian team MTZ-RIPO Minsk. He played 111 games and scores 22 goals for the club and was transferred to FC Minsk in December 2008.

His latest club was Neman Grodno in 2015.

References

External links
Football-Line-Up Profile

1981 births
Living people
Ivorian footballers
Ivorian expatriate footballers
Expatriate footballers in Belarus
Expatriate footballers in Uzbekistan
Sabé Sports players
ASEC Mimosas players
FC Partizan Minsk players
FC Minsk players
FC Shakhtyor Soligorsk players
FC Shurtan Guzar players
FC Neman Grodno players
Association football midfielders